is a passenger railway station located in the town of Samukawa, Kōza District. Kanagawa Prefecture, Japan.

Lines

Station layout
The station consists of a single island platform connected by a footbridge to the station building. The station is unattended.

Platforms

History
Kurami Station was opened on April 1, 1926 as the initial terminal station the Sagami Railway. The line was extended to Atsugi on July 15, 1926 and freight services were initiated on the same day. On June 1, 1944, the Sagami Railway was nationalized and merged with the Japan National Railways. Freight services were discontinued in 1961. On April 1, 1987, with the dissolution and privatization of the Japan National Railways, the station came under the operation of JR East. Automated turnstiles using the Suica IC card system came into operation from November 2001.

Passenger statistics
In fiscal 2014, the station was used by an average of 1,947 passengers daily (boarding passengers only).

Surrounding area
JX Metals, Kurami plant
Kirin Sagami plant

See also
List of railway stations in Japan

References

External links

 

Railway stations in Japan opened in 1926
Railway stations in Kanagawa Prefecture
Sagami Line
Samukawa